Erythrodes (false helmetorchid) is a genus of flowering plants from the orchid family, Orchidaceae. It contains 26 currently recognised species, native to Southeast Asia, China, the Indian Subcontinent, New Guinea, and some islands of the Pacific.

Erythrodes amboinensis (J.J.Sm.) J.J.Sm. -  Ambon
Erythrodes bicalcarata (R.S.Rogers & C.T.White) W.Kittr. - New Guinea
Erythrodes bicarinata Schltr. - New Guinea, Vanuatu
Erythrodes blumei (Lindl.) Schltr. in K.M.Schumann & C.A.G.Lauterbach - from Assam east to Taiwan, south to Java
Erythrodes boettcheri Ames - Luzon
Erythrodes celebensis P.O'Byrne - Sulawesi
Erythrodes forcipata Schltr. - New Guinea
Erythrodes glandulosa (Lindl.) Ames - Borneo
Erythrodes glaucescens Schltr.  - New Guinea
Erythrodes hirsuta (Griff.) Ormerod in G.Seidenfaden - Hainan, Assam, Bhutan, Myanmar, Thailand, Vietnam 
Erythrodes humilis (Blume) J.J.Sm. -  Java, Sumatra, peninsular Malaysia
Erythrodes johorensis (P.O'Byrne) Ormerod - peninsular Malaysia
Erythrodes latifolia Blume -  Java, Sumatra, peninsular Malaysia
Erythrodes latiloba Ormerod - Sri Lanka
Erythrodes oxyglossa Schltr. - Fiji, New Caledonia, Samoa, Tonga, Vanuatu, Wallis & Futuna 
Erythrodes papuana Schltr. in K.M.Schumann & C.A.G.Lauterbach  - New Guinea
Erythrodes parvula Kores  - Fiji, Tonga
Erythrodes praemorsa Schltr. - New Guinea
Erythrodes purpurascens Schltr. in K.M.Schumann & C.A.G.Lauterbach  - New Guinea, Fiji, Tonga, Samoa
Erythrodes sepikana Schltr. - New Guinea
Erythrodes sutricalcar L.O.Williams - New Guinea
Erythrodes tetrodonta Ormerod  - New Guinea
Erythrodes torricellensis Schltr.  - New Guinea
Erythrodes triloba Carr - Sabah
Erythrodes weberi Ames - Philippines
Erythrodes wenzelii Ames - Philippines

See also 
 List of Orchidaceae genera

References 

  (1825) Bijdragen tot de flora van Nederlandsch Indië 8: 410.
  (2003). Genera Orchidacearum 3: 85 ff. Oxford University Press.
  2005. Handbuch der Orchideen-Namen. Dictionary of Orchid Names. Dizionario dei nomi delle orchidee. Ulmer, Stuttgart

External links 

Cranichideae genera
Goodyerinae